William Morley (ca. 1531 – 24 November 1597) was an English politician.

He was the eldest son of Thomas Morley of Glynde, Sussex and educated at Cambridge University.

He was appointed High Sheriff of Surrey and Sussex for 1580–81. He was a Member (MP) of the Parliament of England for Lewes in 1571.

He was married twice: firstly Ann, the daughter of Anthony Pelham of Warbleton, Sussex, with whom he had 1 or 2 sons and 3 daughters and secondly Margaret, the daughter of William Roberts of Warbleton, with whom he had a further 2 or 3 sons and a daughter. He was succeeded by his son Herbert Morley.

References

1531 births
1597 deaths
English MPs 1571
High Sheriffs of Surrey
High Sheriffs of Sussex